Roger de Meyland (died 1295) was a medieval Bishop of Coventry and Lichfield, England.

Roger was a cousin of King Henry III of England, although the exact relationship is unclear. Roger was born c. 1215, and may have been a son of William de Longespee, uncle of Henry III. Little is known of his early career, and he first appears in 1257 as a canon of Lichfield and a papal chaplain. He was elected in January 1257, and consecrated on 10 March 1258. His election was probably due to the influence of Richard of Cornwall, King Henry's brother, whom Roger later accompanied to Germany, where Richard had been elected king.

Roger was High Sheriff of Berkshire in 1271.

Roger died on 16 December 1295.

Notes

Citations

References

 
 
 

Roger de Meyland
13th-century English Roman Catholic bishops
Bishops of Lichfield
High Sheriffs of Berkshire
High Sheriffs of Oxfordshire
Year of birth unknown